Carlos Campos (born 26 November 1931) is a Portuguese equestrian. He competed in two events at the 1972 Summer Olympics.

References

External links
 

1931 births
Living people
Portuguese male equestrians
Olympic equestrians of Portugal
Equestrians at the 1972 Summer Olympics
Place of birth missing (living people)